The Silesian Voivodeship (German: Woiwodschaft Schlesien) was an autonomous province (voivodeship) of the Second Polish Republic. The bulk of its territory had formerly belonged to the German/Prussian Province of Silesia and became part of the newly reborn Poland as a result of the 1921 Upper Silesia plebiscite, the Geneva Conventions, three Upper Silesian Uprisings, and the eventual partition of Upper Silesia between Poland, Germany and Czechoslovakia. The remainder had been the easternmost portion of Austrian Silesia (see Cieszyn Silesia) which was partitioned between Poland and Czechoslovakia following the collapse of Austria-Hungary, the Polish–Czechoslovak War and the Spa Conference of 1920. The capital of the voivodeship was Katowice.

The voivodeship was dissolved on 8 October 1939 following the German invasion of Poland, and its territory was incorporated into the German Province of Silesia. After the defeat of Nazi Germany in World War II, its territory was incorporated into a new, larger Silesian Voivodeship which existed until 1950.

General description 
The Silesian Voivodeship was one of the richest and best developed provinces of inter-war Poland. It owed its wealth to rich deposits of coal, which resulted in the construction of numerous coal mines and steelworks. For this reason, this Voivodeship was crucial to Polish armaments production. However, its location on the border with Germany made it vulnerable. In the mid-1930s, the Polish government decided to move some sectors of heavy industry to the nation's heartland, creating the  Central Industrial Region. Due to efficient agricultural practices, the Silesian Voivodeship also was a major producer of food, in spite of its small size.

According to the 1931 Polish census, 92.3% of the population stated Polish as their mother tongue. Germans made up 7% and Jews only 0.5%. Poles lived mainly in the villages (95.6% of the population there), while Germans and Jews preferred cities (12.9% of Polish Upper Silesian cities' population was German, especially Katowice).

Population density was the highest in the country at 299 persons per 1 km2. On 1 January 1937, forested areas made up 27.9% of the province. Rail density was the highest in the country at 18.5 km per 100 km2. In 1931, the illiteracy rate was the lowest in the country at 1.5% of the population.

History 

After the First World War a dispute arose about the future of Upper Silesia. This part of the Silesia region was the least affected by centuries of Germanisation. The population was predominantly Slavic, especially in rural areas.  Many of them considered themselves Poles, and some Czechs. The rest did not feel any strong connections to either of those nations; according to Wojciech Korfanty's estimations, this last group represented up to a third of the total whole population of the  region.

The Treaty of Versailles resolved that a plebiscite be conducted so that the local population could decide whether Upper Silesia should be assigned to Poland or to Germany. Before the plebiscite took place, two Silesian Uprisings supporting the Polish option had broken out. A third uprising occurred after the plebiscite.

Based on the results of the plebiscite, which was held on 20 March 1921, Upper Silesia was divided between Poland and Germany. The Polish part was incorporated as the Silesian Voivodeship. After the referendum of 1921, the German-Polish Accord on East Silesia (Geneva Convention) was concluded on 15 May 1922 and dealt with the constitutional and legal future of Upper Silesia, as part of it had become Polish territory.

The voivodeship was one of the most economically-developed parts of Poland. It had been granted autonomous status by an Act of the Polish Sejm dated 15 July 1920. That status was secure until the May Coup in 1926, which started various attempts to limit it in favour of a strong and centralised state.

After the German invasion of Poland, the voivodeship was dissolved on 8 October 1939, and its territory was incorporated into the German Province of Upper Silesia. The territory returned to Polish possession at the end of the war, and the 1920 act giving autonomous powers to the Silesian Voivodeship was formally repealed by a law of 6 May 1945. An enlarged Silesian Voivodeship (unofficially called Silesia-Dąbrowa Voivodeship) continued in existence until 1950, when it was divided into Katowice Voivodeship and Opole Voivodeship. (For details, see Administrative division of the People's Republic of Poland.)

Politics 
The voivodeship possessed wide autonomy in domestic matters excluding foreign and military policy. It had its own Silesian Parliament with 48 MPs (24 since 1935) elected in democratic elections. Legislation, however, had to be consistent with the Polish constitution. The voivodeship also had its own national treasury - the Silesian Treasury. Only around 10% of taxes were transferred to Polish national treasury.  The head of the administration was headed by a voivode appointed by the president of Poland to act as a representative of the central government.

Administrative divisions

Counties (powiaty)
In mid-1939, in the wake of invasion, the population of the voivodeship was 1,533,500 (together with Zaolzie, annexed in October 1938. The voivodeship was divided into the following counties; with largest cities based on the 1931 population census).

Voivodes 

Józef Rymer 16 June 1922 – 5 December 1922
Zygmunt Żurawski 15 December 1922 – 1 February 1923 (acting)
Antoni Schultis 1 February 1923 – 3 March 1924
Tadeusz Koncki 15 October 1923 – 2 May 1924 (acting until 3 March 1924)
Mieczysław Bilski 6 May 1924 – 3 September 1926
Michał Grażyński 6 September 1926 – 5 September 1939

See also 
 State country

Notes

References 
 "Mały rocznik statystyczny" nakładem Głównego Urzędu Statystycznego - 1939 (Concise Statistical Year-Book of Poland, Warsaw 1939).

 
Former voivodeships of the Second Polish Republic
Autonomous regions